Matija Špoljarić (born 2 April 1997) is a Cypriot professional footballer who plays as a midfielder for Aris Limassol and the Cyprus national team.

International
He made his debut for Cyprus national football team on 21 March 2019, in a Euro 2020 qualifier against San Marino, as a 54th-minute substitute for Fotios Papoulis.

Personal life
Matija Špoljarić is the son of former Apollon Limassol and Cyprus international midfielder Milenko Špoljarić and he has two brothers Alexander and Danilo.

Career statistics

Club

International

References

External links
 
 
 

1997 births
Living people
Cypriot footballers
Cyprus under-21 international footballers
Cyprus international footballers
Serbian footballers
Serbia youth international footballers
Cypriot people of Serbian descent
Cypriot people of Croatian descent
Cypriot First Division players
Apollon Limassol FC players
Association football midfielders